Bastion Road, also known as Bastion Gardens, is a football stadium in Prestatyn, Wales.  It is currently used for football matches and is the home ground of Prestatyn Town F.C.  The stadium holds up to 2,300 people, although the record attendance was 1,280.

History 

Prestatyn moved to their present site in 1969 when their previous ground at the rear of the Central Beach Club (the large public house that can be seen directly opposite the ground) was sold off for development.
For many years the new ground was relatively undeveloped with the only building being the dressing room block which for its time was modern and well-equipped with spacious dressing rooms, a tea bar and storage rooms - but the rest of the ground fell some way short.
The pitch was just roped off and access was from Bastion Gardens as it is to this day. No other spectator facilities were available and low crowds reflected the spartan surroundings in the dead of winter but early and late season games in the warmer weather often saw gates top the 100 mark.

Plans to build a 250-seated stand over the dressing room block were drawn up but the scheme was costly and never came to fruition. A lean-to cover was added to the building in the late 1970s to afford spectators some shelter from the elements. In the mid-1980s another set of plans were drawn up to build a covered enclosure but again, this never came to fruition.
Thus the scene remained virtually unchanged until the 1992/3 close season when, after being elected to the Welsh Alliance League as runners-up to St Asaph City, a post and rail was erected around the pitch along with brick built dugouts.

This work was initiated by club stalwart Henry Porter and then chairman Glyn Breeze Jones and part of the labour was carried out by community service offenders.
In the mid-1990s old bus shelters were acquired from Prestatyn Town Council after the main bus station in the town centre was modernised and these were put up on the cricket field side of the ground which although something of an eyesore, offered adequate protection from the rain and gave the ground a more 'enclosed' feel.
In 1995 the committee decided that in-house bar facilities were needed and with the help of a loan from Prestatyn Town Council, the building was extended towards the cricket field and a small bar installed and gave the club its first proper base for meetings.

It was officially opened for a match against a Manchester United XI in July 1995 which the Red Devils won 5–0 in front of a record attendance for a Prestatyn game of 3,200.
When incoming chairman Steve Jones took over the helm in 2004/5, he took the project to new heights and added on the new bar area as well as demolishing the bus shelters and replacing them with a new more modern stand which provided seating for 200 and covered standing for another 150.
At the same time the entrance was fenced off and a turnstile built with hard standing laid all around the pitch. The dressing rooms and kitchen area were also redeveloped and extensive landscaping work carried out.
But the biggest changes came in the summer of 2008 when, having clinched promotion to the Welsh Premier League, the committee and volunteers were left with just eight days to bring the ground up to the required criteria.

The club's original application was due to be heard in March but was deferred until 23 April. The deadline to meet the criteria was 1 May.
At the meeting of Denbighshire County Council at Ruthin on the 23rd, the application was heard at 10am and passed through 'on the nod' in record time, by five past ten chairman Tony Thackeray had phoned the good news to the ground and by ten past the workmen were hard at it, digging footings for lights and laying concrete bases for the new seats.
In just eight days the floodlights were put up and working, a turnstile block was built, 200 extra seats were installed, a press box went up, the referee's changing accommodation was revamped and the whole ground was tidied up and painted. The then Welsh Premier League Secretary John Deakin came to inspect the work and passed the ground as fit for promotion.

In order to meet the new higher criteria when the Welsh Premier League's format changed to the Super 12 in 2010/11, Prestatyn were required to build further spectator accommodation, improve car parking facilities, provide more hard standing, enlarge the dressing rooms and create more turnstile entrances. The Seasiders carried out ongoing work throughout their inaugural WPL season, paying for it as and when funds allowed.
At Christmas 2008, the open seats were covered and in March 2009 a further 60 seats were added and covered which meant Bastion Gardens had the requisite 500 seating capacity to comply with the FAW Domestic Licence. For the big Bank Holiday derby on Easter Monday 2009, the old pay hut which had stood at the clubhouse end was given a makeover and installed at the top of the ground where a new walkway and railing were also added.

In early 2009 plans were submitted to Denbighshire Council for another 500 seat stand behind the top goal and a brick built facility to house the boardroom, club shop, tea bar, a toilet and stores. In spring 2009 the club were awarded a grant of £8,500 towards the cost of installing a concrete panel fence along the whole of the Bastion Gardens side and across the top end of the ever-improving stadium.
On 29 July 2009, Denbighshire's planning committee unanimously approved submissions for the new stand - which would also contain a refreshment bar, additional toilets and disabled seating - behind the 'top' goal as well as a combined TV gantry and interview area plus a police control room on the Bastion Gardens side.
Coming on the back of earlier approval for the utility building and an extension to the dressing rooms and covered terracing/seating at the Clubhouse end, the Seasiders now had the requisite permission to build all the facilities they needed to meet the Domestic Licence and also the UEFA Licence in due course.

The latter half of 2009 saw the club striving to attain Super 12 status and while manager Neil Gibson made improvements to his squad in order to compete on the pitch, off the field the committee began planning the necessary grant applications that would enable them to upgrade the facilities.

In January 2010 after a two-month delay, the Welsh Grounds Improvements Trust awarded them just short of £32,000 to build a new medical room, extend the dressing rooms to meet the new criteria, lay down concrete over the grassed areas in front of the clubhouse and build a new TV gantry and police control room. In addition a spacious disabled area was also built which provided covered accommodation for six spectators and their carers if needed, all sited within easy reach of the club's facilities.

References

Football venues in Wales
Stadiums in Wales
Prestatyn Town F.C.
Sports venues completed in 1969
Prestatyn